Purmepeda Dam is an earthfill dam on Bori river near Dhule in the Indian state of Maharashtra.

Specifications

Purpose
 Irrigation

See also
 Dams in Maharashtra
 List of reservoirs and dams in India

References

Dams in Dhule district
Dams completed in 1955
1955 establishments in Bombay State